A514 is a particular type of high strength steel, which is quenched and tempered alloy steel, with a yield strength of 100,000 psi (100 ksi or approximately 700 MPa). The ArcelorMittal trademarked name is T-1. A514 is primarily used as a structural steel for building construction. A517 is a closely related alloy that is used for the production of high-strength pressure vessels.

This is a standard set by the standards organization ASTM International, a voluntary standards development organizations that sets technical standards for materials, products, systems, and services.

Specifications

A514

A517

Usage
A514 steels are used where a weldable, machinable, very high strength steel is required to save weight or meet ultimate strength requirements.  It is normally used as a structural steel in building construction, cranes, or other large machines supporting high loads.

In addition, A514 steels are specified by military standards (ETL 18-11) for use as small-arms firing range baffles and deflector plates.

References

Steels
Structural steel